Ambika nagar is a village in Pathardi taluka, Ahmednagar district of Maharashtra state in Indian territory.

Geography
The village is located on intersection of Pathardi.

References
https://www.justdial.com/Nashik/Banks-in-Ambika-Nagar/nct-10035653

Villages in Pathardi taluka
Villages in Ahmednagar district